Komae, Tokyo held a local election on April 22, 2007.

Candidates
Source:

Returning incumbents
, a 41-year-old man
, a 55-year-old woman
, a 47-year-old man and later Tokyo Metropolitan Assemblyman
, a 58-year-old man
, a 60-year-old man
, a 40-year-old woman
, a 39-year-old man
, a 59-year-old man
, a 62-year-old man
, a 57-year-old man
, a 56-year-old man
, a 56-year-old man
, a 42-year-old man
, a 59-year-old woman
, a 61-year-old man

Newcomers
, a 52-year-old man
, a 54-year-old woman
, a 47-year-old man
, a 43-year-old man
, a 55-year-old woman
, a 46-year-old man
, a 58-year-old woman
, a 56-year-old woman
, a 63-year-old man
, a 42-year-old man
, a 29-year-old woman
, a 49-year-old woman
, a 45-year-old woman

Results

|-
! style="background-color:#E9E9E9;text-align:left;" |Parties
! style="background-color:#E9E9E9;text-align:right;" |Votes
! style="background-color:#E9E9E9;text-align:right;" |%
! style="background-color:#E9E9E9;text-align:right;" |Seats
|-
| style="text-align:left;" |Japanese Communist Party (日本共産党, Nihon Kyōsan-tō)
| style="text-align:right;" | 6,688
| style="text-align:right;" | 
| style="text-align:right;" | 6
|-
| style="text-align:left;" |New Komeito Party (公明党, Kōmeitō)
| style="text-align:right;" | 5,201
| style="text-align:right;" | 
| style="text-align:right;" | 4
|-
| style="text-align:left;" |Liberal Democratic Party (自由民主党, Jiyū Minshutō)
| style="text-align:right;" | 5,123
| style="text-align:right;" | 
| style="text-align:right;" | 4
|-
| style="text-align:left;" |Democratic Party of Japan (民主党, Minshutō)
| style="text-align:right;" | 1,259
| style="text-align:right;" | 
| style="text-align:right;" | 1
|-
| style="text-align:left;" |Social Democratic Party (社民党 Shamin-tō)
| style="text-align:right;" | 1,184
| style="text-align:right;" | 
| style="text-align:right;" | 1
|-
| style="text-align:left;" |Tokyo Seikatsusha Network (生活者ネットワーク, Seikatsusha Netto)
| style="text-align:right;" | 1,121
| style="text-align:right;" | 
| style="text-align:right;" | 1
|-
| style="text-align:left;" | Independents
| style="text-align:right;" | 7,050
| style="text-align:right;" | 
| style="text-align:right;" | 5
|-
|style="text-align:left;background-color:#E9E9E9"|Total (turnout 51.11%)
|width="75" style="text-align:right;background-color:#E9E9E9"| N/A
|width="30" style="text-align:right;background-color:#E9E9E9"| 100.00
|width="30" style="text-align:right;background-color:#E9E9E9"| 22
|-
| style="text-align:left;" colspan=4 |Source:
|}

Candidate results

References

Komae, Tokyo
2007 elections in Japan
April 2007 events in Japan
2007 in Tokyo
Local elections in Japan